Marc or Mark Goldberg may refer to:
 Marc Wallice (Marc Stephen Goldberg, born 1959), American porn actor
 Mark Goldberg (football manager), English football club chairman and manager
 Mark Goldberg (politician), American lawyer and politician from New York. 
 Marc Goldberg, American bassoonist with the New York Woodwind Quintet
 Marc Goldberg (playwright) (born 1968), French playwright and theatre director